La Française (English: The French) was a French professional cycling team that existed from 1901 to 1955. Maurice Garin won the 1903 Tour de France with the team. Their rider Léon Scieur won the 1921 Tour de France when riders participated as individuals.

References

External links

Cycling teams based in France
Defunct cycling teams based in France
Establishments in France
1955 disestablishments in France
Cycling teams established in 1901
Cycling teams disestablished in 1955